In United States federal legislation, the Railway Mail Service Pay Act of July 28, 1916 provided that the Interstate Commerce Commission establish a fair, reasonable rate of compensation to be received by railroads for carrying the mail in the United States.

1916 in American law
United States federal postal legislation
United States federal commerce legislation